The 2013 FIBA Stanković Continental Champions' Cup, or 2013 FIBA Mini World Cup, officially called Dongfeng Yueda KIA FIBA Stanković Continental Champions' Cup 2013 editions (I) and (II), were the 10th and 11th annual FIBA Stanković Continental Champions' Cup tournaments. They were held as two separate round-robin tournaments, in Lanzhou and Guangzhou, from June 27 to July 9.

Lanzhou Tournament

Participating teams

Matches

June 27 
 61–56 

 79–67 

 59–62

June 28 
 66–70 

 59–64 

 60–77

June 29 
 68–72 

 71–54 

 60–51

June 30 
 61–71 

 57–60 

 79–64

July 2 
 61 – 76 

 59 – 66 

 56 – 66

Final standings 

 Head-to-head record

Guangzhou Tournament

Participating teams

Matches

Group stage

July 5 
 58 - 52 

 72 - 58

July 6 
 73 - 62 

 58 - 73

July 7 
 58 - 66 

 47 - 59

Standings

Final stage

July 9

Third-place Playoff 
 67 - 70

Final 
 61 - 44

Final standings

External links 
  

2013
2013–14 in Chinese basketball
2013–14 in Australian basketball
2013–14 in Argentine basketball
2013–14 in German basketball
2013 in Nigerian sport
2013 in Puerto Rican sports